Apolonio is the debut mixtape by American singer-songwriter Omar Apollo. It was released on October 16, 2020, through Warner Records.

Track listing

Charts

References

2020 mixtape albums
Albums produced by Michael Uzowuru
Debut mixtape albums
Omar Apollo albums
Spanish-language albums
Warner Records albums